, also known by the abbreviation , is a manga series written by Ikoma and illustrated by Tomomoka Midori. The manga, which is a follow-up to the 2010 web manga series Tokurei Sochi Dantai Stella Jo-Gakuin Chūtō-ka C3-Bu, was published in Kodansha's Monthly Young Magazine from May 2012 to December 2013. An anime television adaptation by Gainax aired in Japan between July and September 2013.

Plot
Yura Yamato has just transferred to the prestigious  and discovers that it is difficult to find friends in her first day at school. The story revolves around Yura's experiences as a member of the C3 Club and her interactions with her fellow members.

Characters

Stella Women's Academy

A freshman in Stella Women's Academy who recently transferred from an unnamed middle school. She possesses a timid personality and a vivid imagination. Since middle school, she has been struggling in making friends, and ends up in the C3 Club after meeting Sonora and the others. She is initially shy, but as she participates in more matches and engaging in self driven personal training, she becomes a lot more focused and becomes formidable enough to fight on par and possibly surpass Sonora and Rin, which both are arguble the most refined best gunslinger around. She has an active imagination that lets her envision her matches like real battles, which often helps hone her instincts. She carries an Škorpion vz. 61 submachine gun replica as her weapon which was given to her by Sonora.

Third year student in Stella Women's Academy and the club president of C3 Club. She is known for her good looks in contrast to her rather rough personality. Sonora is Yura's roommate and, upon her return from a competition in America, becomes Yura's trainer in handling firearms. Among the C3 Club, Sonora is feared for her expertise in fighting using a variety of firearms, although she seems to show a preference to using two handguns at the same time. She owns an IMI Desert Eagle replica pistol and several competitive shooting items, which she stores in her room. In the end of ep.1 she uses real IMI Desert Eagle in .50AE participating in shooting competition. She is the one who gave Yura her vz. 61 scorpion, which she in turn received from her "master"; an American airsoft enthusiast and soldier who supposedly served under a famous unit and was killed in action.

 
First year student in Stella Women's Academy. She is the moodmaker of the C3 Club, a natural airhead and a friendly face. She acts as a supportive unit, helping out her allies in combat. She is seen in the opening with a replica AK-47. Her family runs a sweets shop and as a result has an affinity for baked goods and sweets in general.

Second year student of Stella Women's Academy. She is three-fourths Japanese. Karila is known not only for her tomboyish personality, but her single-minded character. Karila is considered to be the C3 Club's ace, known for her unparalleled mobility and expertise in close-quarters combat. She is seen mostly using an FN P90 replica as her primary weapon.

 

Second year student of Stella Women's Academy. She often shows a calm personality and a sharp mind, and is also known for being an honors student academically. In combat, she acts as the commander, directing her allies in battle and formulating tactics. She uses a scoped k (kurz) version of the Heckler and Koch G36.

 

A first-year student in Stella Women's Academy, and the energetic "spoiled child" of C3 Club. She is the granddaughter of Stella Women's Academy's chairman. Her strong point is long-ranged combat using sniper rifles. Yachiyo owns an Accuracy International L96 AWS replica manufactured by Tokyo Marui.

Other characters
 

A student at Meisei Girl's Academy. She is the leader of her academy's survival game club, the longtime nemesis of the C3 Club. She is a friend of Sonora, having been her teammate during competitions in America. After the death of her master, she adopted a philosophy to not show any weakness, thus leading her to play airsoft by routing the opponent rather than completing the objective.

 

Leader of the Seto Family survival game team. She is from the Kansai region.

 

Karila's twin brother, who is a member of Sendou Academy's Opera Club, who also participates in airsoft. With his acting skills, he is capable of impersonating his sister.

Media

Manga
Stella Women’s Academy, High School Division Class C3 is a sequel of the web manga series, that was written by Ikoma and Getsumin and illustrated by Kokudō 12-gō and Getsumin, and published by Enterbrain on their Famitsu Comic Clear site between April 1, 2010 and February 24, 2012. There have been two volumes of the web series published on January 15, 2011, and May 14, 2011. Stella Women’s Academy, High School Division Class C3 is written by Ikoma and illustrated by Tomomoka Midori, and published by Kodansha in their Monthly Young Magazine. The series was published from May 9, 2012, to December 16, 2013, and compiled into three tankōbon volumes, released between January 4, 2013, and February 6, 2014. A 4-panel manga series also by Ikoma and Tomomoka Midori, titled  was published on Kodansha's Comic Plus website. The series' 252 strips were published between February 14 and October 5, 2013, and half of them were collected in a tankōbon volume, released on August 6, 2013.

Anime
An anime television series adaptation aired on TBS between July 4 and September 26, 2013 and was simulcast by Crunchyroll. The series is directed by Masayoshi Kawajiri and produced by Gainax, with character designs by Manami Umeshita and music by Kōtarō Nakagawa. The opening theme is "Shape My Story" by Anna Yano and the ending theme,  by Yui Makino, Miyuki Sawashiro, Ai Kayano, Chiwa Saitō, Rima Nishizaki and Madoka Yonezawa. The anime has been licensed by Sentai Filmworks in North America and released on home video in 2014.

Episode list

References

External links
 Tokurei Sochi Dantai Stella Jo-Gakuin Chūtō-ka C3-Bu at Famitsu 
 Tokurei Sochi Dantai Stella Jo-Gakuin Kōtō-ka C3-Bu at Kodansha 
 Official anime website at TBS 
 

2013 anime television series debuts
Airsoft
Anime series based on manga
Comedy anime and manga
Enterbrain manga
Kadokawa Dwango franchises
Gainax
Kodansha manga
Madman Entertainment anime
Seinen manga
Shōnen manga
Sentai Filmworks
Slice of life anime and manga
Sports anime and manga
TBS Television (Japan) original programming